Brandon James Fleming (born 3 December 1999) is an English professional footballer who plays for League One club Oxford United on loan from  side Hull City as a defender.

Club career

Hull City 
Fleming joined Hull City at the age of nine and signed a scholarship in July 2016. He signed his first professional deal in February 2017 after impressing for the Under-18s. On 22 August 2017, he made his debut in a 2–0 EFL Cup defeat to Doncaster Rovers. On 30 November 2020, Fleming signed a new two-and-a-half-year deal with the club. On 9 July 2022, Fleming signed a three-year contract extension, with the club holding an option for a further year.

Gainsborough Trinity 
Fleming joined Gainsborough Trinity on 27 February 2018 on an initial months loan.

Bolton Wanderers 
He signed with League One club Bolton Wanderers on a six-month loan on 17 January 2020.

Oxford United 
Fleming signed with League One club Oxford United on a six-month loan on 6 January 2023.

Career statistics

References 

1999 births
Living people
English footballers
Association football defenders
Hull City A.F.C. players
Gainsborough Trinity F.C. players
Bolton Wanderers F.C. players
Oxford United F.C. players
English Football League players
Northern Premier League players